Syria participated in the 2008 Asian Beach Games held in Bali, Indonesia from October 18, 2008 to October 26, 2008.

Medals

Gold
  Marathon swimming
Men's 5 km: Saleh Mohammad
Men's 10 km: Saleh Mohammad

See also
 Syria at the 2006 Asian Games

Nations at the 2008 Asian Beach Games
2008
Asian Beach Games